Gaj is a village in Croatia, administratively located in the Town of Lipik in Požega-Slavonia County. It is known for its RomanSaturnalia festival.

Populated places in Požega-Slavonia County
Lipik